
Gmina Poniec is an urban-rural gmina (administrative district) in Gostyń County, Greater Poland Voivodeship, in west-central Poland.

Villages
Apart from the town of Poniec, Gmina Poniec contains the villages and settlements of Bączylas, Bogdanki, Czarkowo, Drzewce, Dzięczyna, Dzięczynka, Franciszkowo, Grodzisko, Janiszewo, Kopanie, Łęka Mała, Maciejewo, Miechcin, Rokosowo, Sarbinowo, Śmiłowo, Szurkowo, Teodozewo, Waszkowo, Włostki, Wydawy, Zawada and Żytowiecko.

Neighbouring gminas
Gmina Poniec is bordered by the gminas of Bojanowo, Gostyń, Krobia, Krzemieniewo, Miejska Górka and Rydzyna.

References
Polish official population figures 2006

Poniec
Gostyń County